The Forest Park Golf Course, also known as the Courses at Forest Park or the Norman Probstein Community Golf Course, opened in 1912 as a nine-hole golf course. The original course was designed by Scotsman Robert Foulis, an employee of the Old Course at St Andrews, while a second and third set of nine holes were finished in 1913 and 1915. In 1929, the Forest Park Golf Course was home to the U.S. Amateur Public Links Championship.

Between 2001 and 2004, the three courses and the clubhouse were rebuilt under the direction of course designer Stan Gentry. The rebuilding project initially was funded by St. Louis developer Norman Probstein with a gift of $2 million, followed by donations of $2 million from Eagle Golf, $2.4 million from the Danforth Foundation, $4.5 million from Forest Park Forever, and $1.6 million from the city of St. Louis. The three rebuilt courses are named for trees in St. Louis: the Hawthorn is a relatively flat and walkable layout; the Dogwood is a somewhat hilly course with a water fairway; and the Redbud is very hilly and the most challenging layout of the three. One glass-enclosed clubhouse serves all three courses, and it includes a restaurant open to all park users known as Ruthie's Grill. After the completion of the renovations, the Forest Park Golf Course was named the Best Golf Course in St. Louis by the local alternative newspaper, the Riverfront Times.

References

External links
 Official website
 
 

1912 establishments in Missouri
Golf clubs and courses in Missouri